The Hennops River is one of the larger rivers that drains Gauteng, South Africa. It has its source near Kempton Park, east of Johannesburg and meets the Crocodile River (Limpopo) shortly before Hartbeespoort Dam. It is one of Gauteng's most polluted rivers.

Course

The Hennops River starts in Terenure, Kempton Park, and flows in a northerly direction towards Tembisa township. It then flows past Olifantsfontein and meets the Sesmyl Spruit which flows out of the Rietvlei Dam. The river then turns north-west flowing through the centre of Centurion. The river continues in this direction flowing through the foothills of the Magaliesberg before flowing into the Crocodile River (Limpopo) on its right bank near the Hartbeespoort Dam.

Dams

The Rietvlei Dam, which provides water to City of Tshwane, as well as numerous farm dams are situated in the Hennops River Basin. Lake Centurion as well as numerous weirs are situated on the river.

Pollution

The Hennops River is one of Gauteng's heavily polluted rivers. Insufficient and poorly-maintained sanitation facilities in Tembisa, Ivory Park, Olifantsfontein and Erasmia have turned the river into an open sewer. AfriForum gathered water samples from the Hennops River and according to the results‚ more than 1 000 000 units of the indicator microbe Escherichia coli were present per 100 ml of water. The health risk is high for people coming into full or partial contact with water having more than 2000 colony forming units per 100 ml. Untreated or partially treated sewage also contains high concentrations of phosphate and nitrate, which contribute to the eutrophication problems in Hartbeespoort Dam. In 2020 the FRESH NGO installed litter traps at Clayville township in Tembisa, and locals were employed to remove the waste which soon accumulated.

Tourist attractions

The valley of the river is a weekend and holiday destination for residents of the nearby cities. The banks of the Hennops are a popular location for hiking, fishing, camping, and picnicking. It is crossed by two small suspension bridges, one at Centurion Mall, and the other at Hennops Pride . There are also resorts and a 4x4 trail.

See also
Magaliesberg

References

External links
Natural and anthropogenic influences on water quality: an example from rivers draining the Johannesburg Granite Dome
Tourist Attractions near Hennops River, Gauteng, South Africa
Hennops Off-road Trail - Drive Out

Crocodile River (Limpopo)
Rivers of Gauteng